Denticleless protein homolog is a protein that in humans is encoded by the DTL gene.

Interactions 

DTL (gene) has been shown to interact with P21.

References

Further reading